Moog may refer to:

Electronics and computing
 Moog synthesizer, a synthesizer invented by Robert Moog
 Moog Music, a synthesizer manufacturer founded by Robert Moog
 Moog (code), astronomical software
 Moog Inc., a control-system maker

People
 Moog (surname)
 Robert Moog, synthesizer designer
 Blair Joscelyne (alias Moog), composer and filmmaker
 Andy Moog, ice hockey goaltender

Albums 
 The Happy Moog, a 1969 album by Jean-Jacques Perrey and Harry Breuer.
 Music to Moog By, a 1969 album by Gershon Kingsley.
 The Moog Strikes Bach, a 1969 album by Hans Wurman.
 Moog Indigo, a 1970 album by Jean-Jacques Perrey.
 Moog Sensations, a 1971 album by Jean-Jacques Perrey.
 Moog Expressions, a 1972 album by Jean-Jacques Perrey and Pat Prilly.
 First Moog Quartet, a 1972 album by Kingsley's homonymous group
 Moog Mig Mag Moog, a 1974 album by Jean-Jacques Perrey.
 The Moog Cookbook, a 1996 album of The Moog Cookbook.

Songs 
  Moog City, a song of C418.

Other
 Moog (film), a 2004 biographical film about Robert Moog
 Moog Center for Deaf Education
 The Moog, a dog-like character in the British children's TV cartoon Willo the Wisp
 The Moog, a Hungarian band
 Moog parts, a brand of mid–high end auto parts owned by Federal-Mogul